Willis Dean Adams (born August 22, 1956) is a former American football wide receiver who played with the Cleveland Browns of the National Football League. Adams attended Schulenburg High School in Schulenburg, Texas.

In his NFL career, Adams recorded 61 receptions, 936 yards, and two touchdowns.

After retiring from the NFL, Adams became a physical education teacher.

Notes

References
 Willis Adams

1956 births
Living people
Players of American football from Texas
American football wide receivers
Cleveland Browns players
Houston Cougars football players
Navarro Bulldogs football players
People from Weimar, Texas